Cong Liang (born December 1971) is a Chinese politician who is the current director of the National Food and Strategic Reserves Administration, in office since June 2022.

Biography
Cong was born in Wendeng County (now Wendeng District of Weihai), Shandong, in December 1971. In 1994, he graduated from Tsinghua University majoring in the Department of Mechanical Engineering before gaining a master's degree in economics from the Central University of Finance and Economics in 1997. He attended the Graduate School of Chinese Academy of Social Sciences where he obtained his doctor's degree in economics in 2003.

Beginning in April 1997, he served in several posts in the State Planning Commission (later renamed National Development and Reform Commission), becoming secretary-general in February 2009 and deputy director in June 2020. On June 23, 2022, he was appointed director of the National Food and Strategic Reserves Administration, succeeding Zhang Wufeng, who was placed under investigation for "serious violations of laws and regulations" by the Central Commission for Discipline Inspection (CCDI), the party's internal disciplinary body, and the National Supervisory Commission, the highest anti-corruption agency of China, on June 16.

References

1971 births
Living people
People from Wendeng
Tsinghua University alumni
Central University of Finance and Economics alumni
Chinese Academy of Social Sciences alumni
People's Republic of China politicians from Shandong
Chinese Communist Party politicians from Shandong